Francisco Jairo Silva Santos (born 31 January 1988 in Picos, Piauí), commonly called as Jairo, is a Brazilian football player at the position of midfielder for Ríver on loan from Campinense.

Jairo played for Santa Cruz and Figueirense in the Campeonato Brasileiro.

References

External links
 
 
 Jaira at ZeroZero

1988 births
Living people
Sportspeople from Piauí
Brazilian footballers
Brazilian expatriate footballers
Association football midfielders
Santa Cruz Futebol Clube players
Villa Rio Esporte Clube players
Sociedade Esportiva Palmeiras players
Figueirense FC players
Mirassol Futebol Clube players
Al-Nasr SC (Kuwait) players
Guarani FC players
América Futebol Clube (RN) players
Clube de Regatas Brasil players
Al-Sulaibikhat SC players
Campinense Clube players
Esporte Clube Primeiro Passo Vitória da Conquista players
FC Anyang players
Santa Cruz Futebol Clube (RN) players
Associação Atlética Santa Rita players
Nacional Atlético Clube (Patos) players
River Atlético Clube players
Campeonato Brasileiro Série B players
Campeonato Brasileiro Série C players
Campeonato Brasileiro Série D players
Brazilian expatriate sportspeople in Kuwait
Expatriate footballers in Kuwait
Kuwait Premier League players